Lakhwinder Singh is an Indian actor who works in Hindi and Punjabi language films and television serials.

Filmography

Television And Web Series

References

External links
 

Living people
Male actors from Punjab, India
Male actors in Hindi cinema
Male actors in Hindi television
Male actors in Punjabi cinema
Year of birth missing (living people)